Branislav Karaulić (born 8 April 1963 in Zemun) is a retired Serbian hurdler who represented the SFR Yugoslavia at the 1988 Summer Olympics in 400m hurdles and 4 × 400 m. He was a member of the Athletics Club Red Star Belgrade.

He now lives in Georgia with his wife and four children.

References

External links 
 Biography at sports references.come

1963 births
Living people
Serbian male hurdlers
Serbian expatriate sportspeople in the United States
Athletes (track and field) at the 1988 Summer Olympics
Olympic athletes of Yugoslavia
Athletes from Belgrade
Yugoslav male hurdlers
Universiade medalists in athletics (track and field)
Universiade silver medalists for Yugoslavia